Beecher Bryan Montgomery (July 20, 1946 – December 12, 2008) was an American actor, known for Badlands (1973), Cat Ballou (1971), and Standing Tall (1978). Bryan Montgomery was born in 1946 in San Angelo, Texas; he died in 2008 in Malibu, California.

Filmography

Film

Television

References

External links

1946 births
2008 deaths
Male actors from Texas
People from San Angelo, Texas
American male film actors
American male television actors
20th-century American male actors